The name Gdańsk Voivodeship has been used twice to designate local governments in Poland:
 Gdańsk Voivodeship (1945–1975)
 Gdańsk Voivodeship (1975–1998)